Tara Würth (born 30 September 2002) is a Croatian tennis player. She has a career-high singles ranking of world No. 158.

Playing for Croatia Fed Cup team, Würth has a win–loss record of 1–2 (as of February 2023).

Grand Slam singles performance timeline

ITF Circuit finals

Singles: 7 (3 titles, 4 runner–ups)

Doubles: 3 (3 runner-ups)

Fed Cup participation

Doubles

References

External links
 
 
 

2002 births
Living people
Croatian female tennis players